The Lord's Day in Christianity is generally Sunday, the principal day of communal worship. It is observed by most Christians as the weekly memorial of the resurrection of Jesus Christ, who is said in the canonical Gospels to have been witnessed alive from the dead early on the first day of the week.

According to some sources, Christians held corporate worship on Sunday in the 1st century. (First Apology, chapter 67), and by 361 AD it had become a mandated weekly occurrence. Before the Early Middle Ages, the Lord's Day became associated with Sabbatarian (rest) practices legislated by Church Councils. Christian denominations such as the Reformed Churches, Methodist Churches, and Baptist Churches regard Sunday as Christian Sabbath, a practice known as first-day Sabbatarianism. First-day Sabbatarian (Sunday Sabbatarian) practices include attending morning and evening church services on Sundays, receiving catechesis in Sunday School on the Lord's Day, taking the Lord's Day off from servile labour, not eating at restaurants on Sundays, not Sunday shopping, not using public transportation on the Lord's Day, not participating in sporting events that are held on Sundays, as well as not viewing television and the internet on Sundays; Christians who are Sunday Sabbatarians often engage in works of mercy on the Lord's Day, such as evangelism, as well as visiting prisoners at jails and the sick at hospitals and nursing homes. A Sunday custom present in many Christian countries is the "hearing" (abhören) of children at dinnertime, in which the parents listen while the children recall what their pastor preached about in the Sunday sermon; if any corrections are needed, the parents instruct them.

In Christian calendars, Sunday is regarded as the first day of the week.

Biblical use
It is the English translation of the Koine Greek Kyriake hemera. The adjective kyriake ("Lord's") often elided its noun, as in the neuter kyriakon for "Lord's [assembly]", the predecessor of the word "church"; the noun was to be supplied by context.

Revelation 1:10 used Kyriake hemera (Κυριακῇ ἡμέρᾳ, "I was in the Spirit on the Lord's Day") in a way apparently familiar to his readers. Early Christians understood this meant he was worshiping on Sunday, resurrection day. The Apostle appears to have used this common nomenclature from the fact that Jesus had said he was "Lord of the Sabbath" and that Isaiah called the Sabbath the "Lord's Holy Day" then this usage implies that in the Lord's Day, the Seventh-day Sabbath (i.e. Saturday) had been transferred to the First Day of the week.

The New Testament also uses the phrase te ... mia ton sabbaton (τῇ ... μιᾷ τῶν σαββάτων, "the first day of the week") both for the early morning (Mary Magdalene ) and evening (the disciples in John 20:19) of Resurrection Sunday, as well as for the breaking of bread at Troas (Acts 20:7) and the day for the collection at Corinth (1 Co 16:2).

Textual tradition

Ambiguous references
The term "Lord's" appears in The Teaching of the Twelve Apostles or Didache, a document dated between 70 and 120. Didache 14:1a is translated by Roberts as, "But every Lord's day gather yourselves together, and break bread, and give thanksgiving"; another translation begins, "On the Lord's own day". The first clause in Greek, "   ", literally means "On the Lord's of the Lord", a unique and unexplained double possessive, and translators supply the elided noun, e.g., "day" ( hemera), "commandment" (from the immediately prior verse 13:7), or "doctrine". This is one of two early extrabiblical Christian uses of "κυριακήν" where it does not clearly refer to Sunday because textual readings have given rise to questions of proper translation. Breaking bread (daily or weekly) may refer to Christian fellowship, agape feasts, or Eucharist (cf.). Didache 14 was apparently understood by the writers of the Didascalia and Apostolic Constitutions as a reference to Sunday worship.

Around 110 AD, St. Ignatius of Antioch used "Lord's" in a passage of his letter to the Magnesians. Ambiguity arises due to textual variants. The only extant Greek manuscript of the letter, the Codex Mediceo-Laurentianus, reads, "If, then, those who had walked in ancient practices attained unto newness of hope, no longer observing Sabbath, but living according to the Lord's life ...".

In the expanded version of Magnesians, this passage to make "Lord's Day" a clear reference to Sunday, as Resurrection Day. This version adds a repudiation of legalistic Sabbath as a Judaizing error: "Let us therefore no longer keep the Sabbath after the Jewish manner, and rejoice in days of idleness .... But let every one of you keep the Sabbath after a spiritual manner, rejoicing in meditation on the law, not in relaxation of the body, admiring the workmanship of God, and not eating things prepared the day before, nor using lukewarm drinks, and walking within a prescribed space, nor finding delight in dancing and plaudits which have no sense in them. And after the observance of the Sabbath, let every friend of Christ keep the Lord’s Day as a festival, the resurrection-day, the queen and chief of all the days." Other early church fathers similarly saw weekly observance of seventh-day Sabbath sometimes followed the next day by Lord's Day assembly.

Undisputed references
The first undisputed reference to Lord's Day is in the apocryphal Gospel of Peter (verse 34,35 and 50), probably written about the middle of the 2nd century or perhaps the first half of that century.  The Gospel of Peter 35 and 50 use kyriake as the name for the first day of the week, the day of Jesus' resurrection. That the author referred to Lord's Day in an apocryphal gospel purportedly written by St. Peter indicates that the term kyriake was very widespread and had been in use for some time.

Around 170 AD, Dionysius, Bishop of Corinth, wrote to the Roman Church, "Today we have kept the Lord's holy day (kyriake hagia hemera), on which we have read your letter."  In the latter half of the 2nd century, the apocryphal Acts of Peter identify Dies Domini (Latin for "Lord's Day") as "the next day after the Sabbath," i.e., Sunday.  From the same period of time, the Acts of Paul present St. Paul praying "on the Sabbath as the Lord's Day (kyriake) drew near."

Early church

In the first centuries, Sunday, being made a festival in honor of Christ's resurrection, received attention as a day of religious services. Over time, Sunday thus came to be known as Lord's Day (some patristic writings termed it as "the eighth day"). These early Christians believed that the resurrection and ascension of Christ signals the renewal of creation, making the day on which God accomplished it a day analogous to the first day of creation when God made the light. Some of these writers referred to Sunday as the "eighth day".

The 1st-century or 2nd-century Epistle of Barnabas or Pseudo-Barnabas on  stated "Sabbaths of the present age" were abolished in favor of one millennial seventh-day Sabbath that ushers in the "eighth day" and commencement of a new world. Accordingly, the eighth-day assembly (Saturday night or Sunday morning) marks both the resurrection and the new creation. Thus first-day observance was a common regional practice at that time.

By the mid-2nd century, Justin Martyr wrote in his apologies about the cessation of Sabbath observance and the celebration of the first (or eighth) day of the week (not as a day of rest, but as a day for gathering to worship): "We all gather on the day of the sun" (τῇ τοῦ ῾Ηλίου λεγομένη ἡμέρᾳ, recalling both the creation of light and the resurrection). He argued that Sabbath was not kept before Moses, and was only instituted as a sign to Israel and a temporary measure because of Israel's sinfulness, no longer needed after Christ came without sin. Curiously he also draws a parallel between the Israelite practice of circumcision on the eighth day, and the resurrection of Jesus on the "eighth day".  

Tertullian (early 3rd century), writing against Christians who participated in pagan festivals (Saturnalia and New-year), defended the Christian festivity of Lord's Day amidst the accusation of sun-worship, acknowledging that "to [us] Sabbaths are strange" and unobserved.

Cyprian, a 3rd-century church father, linked the "eighth day" with the term "Lord's Day" in a letter concerning baptism.

Origins of worship on Sundays
Though Christians widely observed Sunday as a day of worship by the 2nd century, the origin of Sunday worship remains a debated point: scholars promote at least three  positions:

 Bauckham has argued that Sunday worship must have originated in Palestine in the mid-1st century, in the period of the Acts of the Apostles, no later than the Gentile mission; he regards the practice as universal by the early 2nd century with no hint of controversy (unlike. for example, the related Quartodeciman controversy). In the 2nd century the church of Rome lacked jurisdictional authority to impose a novel universal change of Sabbath rest from the seventh day to the first, or to obtain universal Sunday worship had it been introduced after the Christian church had spread throughout the known world. Bauckham states that there is no record of any early Christian group which did not observe Sunday, with the exception of a single extreme group of Ebionites mentioned by Eusebius of Caesarea; and that there is no evidence that Sunday was observed as substitute Sabbath worship in the early centuries.
 Some Protestant scholars have argued that Christian Sunday worship traces back even further, to the resurrection appearances of Jesus recorded in the Gospel narratives where Jesus would appear to his disciples on the first day of the week.
 Seventh-day Adventist scholar Samuele Bacchiocchi has argued that Sunday worship unconnected to the Sabbath was introduced in Rome in the 3rd century, and was later enforced throughout the Christian church as a substitution for Sabbath worship.

Edict of Constantine
On 3 March 321, Constantine I decreed that Sunday (dies Solis) will be observed as the Roman day of rest [CJ3.12.2]:

In this, Constantine's decree gave civil sanction to the common practice of the Christian Church and was designed to promote Christianity throughout his empire.

Middle Ages
Augustine of Hippo followed the early patristic writers in spiritualizing the meaning of the Sabbath commandment, referring it to eschatological rest rather than observance of a literal day. However, the practice of Sunday rest increased in prominence throughout the early Middle Ages. Thomas Aquinas taught that the decalogue is an expression of natural law which binds all men, and therefore the Sabbath commandment is a moral requirement along with the other nine. Thus Sunday rest and Sabbath became increasingly associated.

Following Aquinas' decree, Christian Europeans could now spend less time denouncing the Judaistic method of observing the Sabbath, instead establishing rules for what one "should" and "should not" do on the Sabbath. For example, while the Medieval Church forbade most forms of work on the Sabbath, it allowed "necessary works", and priests would allow their peasants to perform the needed agricultural work in the field.

Modern church

Reformed
The Heidelberg Catechism of the Reformed Churches founded by John Calvin, teaches that the moral law as contained in the Ten Commandments is binding for Christians and that it instructs Christians how to live in service to God in gratitude for His grace shown in redeeming mankind. The doctrine of the Christian Reformed Church in North America thus stipulates "that Sunday must be so consecrated to worship that on that day we rest from all work except that which charity and necessity require and that we refrain from recreation that interferes with worship."

Sunday Sabbatarianism became prevalent amongst both the continental and English Protestants over the following century. A new rigorism was brought into the observance of Lord's Day among the 17th-century Puritans of England and Scotland, in reaction to the laxity with which Sunday observance was customarily kept. Sabbath ordinances were appealed to, with the idea that only the word of God can bind men's consciences in whether or how they will take a break from work, or to impose an obligation to meet at a particular time.  Their influential reasoning spread to other denominations also, and it is primarily through their influence that "Sabbath" has become the colloquial equivalent of "Lord's Day" or "Sunday".  The most mature expression of this influence survives in the Reformed Westminster Confession of Faith (1646), Chapter 21, "Of Religious Worship, and the Sabbath Day".  Section 7-8 reads:

Anabaptism
Anabaptists hold that the Lord's Day should be commemorated through the attendance of church services, along with works of mercy such as "witnessing for God in one of many ways, visiting someone who is sick or discouraged, widows, orphans, or older people, spending time with the family, studying some subject of interest in the Bible that some are wondering about, reading upbuilding literature, etc." In the view of Anabaptist Christianity, "worldly entertainment that would draw our minds away from Christ would be a poor way to commemorate His resurrection". The Statement of Faith and Practice of Salem Amish Mennonite Church, a Conservative Mennonite congregation in the Beachy Amish Mennonite tradition, is reflective of traditional Anabaptist teaching on the Lord's Day:

Likewise, the Church Polity of the Dunkard Brethren Church, a Conservative Anabaptist denomination in the Schwarzenau Brethren tradition, teaches that "The First Day of the week is the Christian Sabbath and is to be kept as a day of rest and worship. (Matt. 28:1; Acts 20:7; John 20:1; Mark 16:2)"

Lutheranism
Martin Luther, in his work against the Antinomians who he saw as heretical, Luther rejected the idea of the abolition of the Ten Commandments. They also viewed Sunday rest as a civic institution, which provided an occasion for bodily rest and public worship. Laestadian Lutherans teach that the Lord's Day should be devoted to God and that engaging in recreational activities on Sundays is sinful.

Methodism
The General Rules of the Methodist Church requires "attending upon all the ordinances of God" including "the public worship of God". The founder of Methodism, John Wesley, stated "This 'handwriting of ordinances' our Lord did blot out, take away, and nail to His cross. But the moral law contained in the Ten Commandments, and enforced by the prophets, He did not take away .... The moral law stands on an entirely different foundation from the ceremonial or ritual law .... Every part of this law must remain in force upon all mankind and in all ages." This is reflected in the doctrine of Methodist denominations, such as the Allegheny Wesleyan Methodist Connection, which in its 2014 Discipline teaches that the Lord's Day "be observed by cessation from all unnecessary labor, and that the day be devoted to divine worship and rest." In explicating the Fourth Commandment, a prominent Methodist catechism states:

Though Sabbatarian practice declined in the 18th century, the evangelical awakening in the 19th century led to a greater concern for strict Sunday observance. The founding of the Lord's Day Observance Society in 1831 was influenced by the teaching of Daniel Wilson.

Roman Catholicism
Before 2nd Vatican council existed rules and practices of keeping Sunday holy

The Second Vatican Council, in the Apostolic Constitution Sacrosanctum Concilium, asserted that "the Lord's day is the original feast day" and the "foundation and kernel of the whole liturgical year." The apostolic letter of Pope John Paul II entitled Dies Domini charged Catholics to remember the importance of keeping Sunday holy and not to confuse the holiness of the Lord's Day celebration with the common notion of the weekend as a time of simple rest and relaxation. The Catholic Church teaches that "The Day of the Lord, after the public worship, should be spent in works of piety and charity, in peaceful relaxation, in the happy union of family life."

Eastern Christianity
The Eastern Orthodox Church distinguishes between "Sabbath" (Saturday) and "Lord's Day" (Sunday), and both continue to play a special role for the faithful. Many parishes and monasteries will serve the Divine Liturgy on both Saturday morning and Sunday morning. The church never allows strict fasting on any Saturday (except Holy Saturday) or Sunday, and the fasting rules on those Saturdays and Sundays which fall during one of the fasting seasons (such as Great Lent, Apostles' Fast, etc.) are always relaxed to some degree. During Great Lent, when the celebration of the Liturgy is forbidden on weekdays, there is always Liturgy on Saturday as well as Sunday. The church also has a special cycle of Bible readings (Epistle and Gospel) for Saturdays and Sundays which is different from the cycle of readings allotted to weekdays. However, Lord's Day, being a celebration of the Resurrection, is clearly given more emphasis. For instance, in the Russian Orthodox Church Sunday is always observed with an All-Night Vigil on Saturday night, and in all of the Orthodox Churches it is amplified with special hymns which are chanted only on Sunday. If a feast day falls on a Sunday it is always combined with the hymns for Sunday (unless it is a Great Feast of the Lord). Saturday is celebrated as a sort of leave-taking for the previous Sunday, on which several of the hymns from the previous Sunday are repeated.

In part, the reason Orthodox Christians continue to celebrate Saturday as Sabbath is because of its role in the history of salvation: it was on a Saturday that Jesus "rested" in the tomb after his work on the cross. For this reason also, Saturday is a day for general commemoration of the departed, and special requiem hymns are often chanted on this day.

The Ethiopian Orthodox church (part of the Oriental Orthodox communion, having about 40 million members) observes both Saturday and Sunday as holy, but places extra emphasis on Sunday.

See also 

 Lord's Day Observance Society
 Sabbath in Christianity
 Saint Kyriake
 Shabbat
 Friday prayer

References

Further reading
From Sabbath to Lord's Day: A Biblical, Historical and Theological Investigation, D.A. Carson, editor (Grand Rapids, Mich.: Zondervan, 1982).
The Study of Liturgy, Cheslyn Jones, Geoffrey Wainwright, Edward Yarnold, SJ, and Paul Bradshaw, editors (New York, N.Y.:Oxford University Press, 1992), pp. 456–458.
From Sabbath to Sunday: A Historical Investigation of the Rise of Sunday Observance in Early Christianity,  Samuele Bacchiocchi, (Rome, Italy,:Pontifical Gregorian University Press 1977)

External links
Dies Domini, Pope John Paul II, On Keeping the Lord's Day Holy
Sabbath and Sunday in Early Christianity, Part 3: Irenaeus, and "the Lord's Day"
Francis Turretin, On the Lord's Day
Early Church dot org dot UK list and links to related works

Christian Sunday observances
Sunday
Easter liturgy
Christian terminology
Biblical phrases